The Christian Democratic National Peasants' Party (officially abbreviated PNȚCD) is a Christian democratic and agrarian political party in Romania. It claims to be the rightful successor of the interwar National Peasants' Party (PNȚ), created from the merger of the Romanian National Party (PNR) from the then Austro-Hungarian-ruled Transylvania and the Peasants' Party (PȚ) from the Romanian Old Kingdom.

PNȚCD was the largest and most important political party of the Romanian Democratic Convention (CDR) during the 1990s and was led by Corneliu Coposu and Ion Diaconescu, two former political prisoners during Communism, but as the 2000s began it gradually feel out of grace amongst centre-right Romanian voters and slowly became an inactive microparty. The party was subsequently excluded from the European People's Party (EPP) in June 2017. Eventually, it joined the European Christian Political Movement (ECPM) in February 2020.

Given a tremendous disdain and resentment towards Pavelescu's leadership (the incumbent party president since 2011 onwards), another Christian peasant group known as the National Peasant Alliance (ANȚ) seceded from the main PNȚCD in 2019 (which, according to them and their electoral basin, greatly drifted from its original ideology) and centered around leader Radu Ghidău (one of the youngest PNȚCD MPs during the legislature of the late 1990s, more specifically the one spanning over 1996–2000) for the 2020 Romanian local elections.

History

1989–1992 

The Christian Democratic National Peasants' Party was (re)-founded by Corneliu Coposu, Ioan Alexandru, and Ion Rațiu in December 1989, being thus the first officially registered political party after the fall of Communism. The party competed in the 1990 elections, where it ranked 4th with 2.5% (or 348,637 votes) and supported Ion Rațiu for president. The PNȚCD presidential candidate ranked 3rd, with 4.3% (or 617,007 votes).

Given the political dominance of the National Salvation Front (FSN) that was exerted prior and after the first free elections in post-1989 Romania, the PNȚCD decided to form a consistent alliance of centre-right parties aiming mainly to oppose it.

As a result, in 1991, most notably alongside the National Liberal Party (but also with other noteworthy civic organisations, foundations, and minor additional right-leaning political parties), the PNȚCD formed the Romanian Democratic Convention (CDR).

Eventually, the PNȚCD would affirm itself as the most dominant internal political force for much of the convention's existence. For the period 1990–1992, PNȚCD was one of the main opposition parties.

1992–1996 

At the 1992 elections, the party ran on a common CDR list (along with other allied parties within the convention) and supported the candidacy of Emil Constantinescu as President of Romania. Consequently, the CDR ranked 2nd, having scored 20.16% (or 2,210,722 votes), while Emil Constantinescu managed to qualify in the second round of the presidential election where he finished second with 38.57% (or 4,641,207 votes). For the period 1992–1996, the party was the main opposition force in the Parliament of Romania.

1996–2000 

At the 1996 elections, CDR managed to rank 1st, with 30.70% (or 3,772,084 votes), and once again supported the candidacy of Emil Constantinescu, who also managed to win the presidency with 54.41% (or 7,057,906 votes). For the period 1996–2000, PNȚCD was the most important governing party within the CDR, being also part of a grand coalition which included the Democratic Party (PD) and the Democratic Alliance of Hungarians in Romania (UDMR/RMDSZ).

At the 2000 elections, PNȚCD ran on a common CDR 2000 list and scored 5.30% (or 575,706 votes), being unable to pass the electoral threshold required for an alliance. This weak electoral result was primarily owed to the fragmentation of the alliance and the scission of the Romanian right into several other parties as well as to the tumultuous previous governing term. For the period 2000–2004, PNȚCD was in extra-parliamentary opposition.

2004–2008 

At the 2004 elections, PNȚCD ran independently, having obtained 1.9% (or 196,027 votes), failing this time as well to surpass the needed electoral threshold. The party supported the presidential candidacy of Gheorghe Ciuhandu, former mayor of Timișoara. Ciuhandu eventually ranked 5th in the first round, with 1.9% (or 198,394 votes).

In March 2005, PNȚCD voted to change its name to the Christian Democratic People's Party (PPCD) after the unification with the Union for Romanian Reconstruction. Eventually, it returned to its original name (PNȚCD). The party did not compete in the 2008 legislative elections.

Afterwards, the party was split between a wing sustained by Marian Petre Miluț supporting Aurelian Pavelescu as president (who decided on an alliance with the then governing Democratic Liberal Party, PDL) and one supporting former Prime Minister and Bucharest mayor Victor Ciorbea as president (who, at that time, favoured an alliance with the National Liberal Party).

2011–present 

Victor Ciorbea was elected on 18 June 2011 president of the party. In September 2011, the Bucharest Courthouse (responsible for the parties registry) recognised Victor Ciorbea as party president. Nonetheless, the split continued until Ciorbea left the party (until October 2012 namely) in order to become a senator on PNL's lists. Pavelescu was subsequently recognised as president and the fractions were dissolved.

For the 2012 legislative elections, PNȚCD ran on a common Right Romania Alliance (ARD), along with the Democratic Liberal Party (PDL), and the Civic Force (FC). The party won one senator seat and one deputy seat. On 23 April 2013, Pavelescu was elected president of the party.

At the 2014 European Parliament election, the party gained only 0.89% of the cast votes, with candidates like former EP member Sebastian Bodu and the current party president, Aurelian Pavelescu, opening the list.

Following the 2019 European Parliament election and thanks to an agreement between the party and the Social Democratic Party (PSD), the party has 1 MEP, more specifically Cristian Terheș.

For the 2019 Romanian presidential election, the party did not compete but endorsed PSD candidate Viorica Dăncilă. Furthermore, the party did not compete for the 2020 Romanian legislative election but it did compete for the 2020 Romanian local elections, where it won 1 mayor and 42 local councillors.

Motto 

Its motto as of 2006 was Fiecare contează (Each one counts). At the 2014 EU elections, PNȚCD's motto was Renaștem pentru România ta! (Reborn for your Romania!).

Ideology 

The PNȚCD is an agrarian, Christian democratic, and Christian humanist political party that stands for "social justice, Christian morality and enlightened patriotism." The party is anti-communist and supports de-Sovietization within Romania. It supports the Universal Declaration of Human Rights in conjunction with the Romanian constitution and seeks to protect the cultural and traditional rights of all Romanian people. It also claims to support equal opportunities for all Romanians, uphold rule of law, defends the right to private property ownership, and calls for economic reform to stimulate the Romanian economy.

Internationally, the party is a member of Centrist Democrat International (CDI) along with other Christian democratic and conservative movements and was affiliated with the European People's Party (EPP) in the European Parliament before joining the European Conservatives and Reformists (ECR) group.

Electoral history

Legislative elections 

Notes:

1 CDR members in 1992: PNȚCD, PAC (7 senators and 13 deputies), PNL-AT (1 senator and 11 deputies), PSDR (1 senator and 10 deputies), PNL-CD (4 senators and 3 deputies), and PER (no senators and 4 deputies).

2 CDR members in 1996: PNȚCD, PNL (22 senators and 28 deputies), PNL-CD (1 senator and 4 deputies), PAR (3 senators and 3 deputies), PER (1 senator and 5 deputies), and Ecologist Federation of Romania (FER - 1 senator and 1 deputy).

3 CDR 2000 members: PNȚCD, UFD, Ecologist Federation of Romania (FER), National Christian Democratic Alliance (ANCD), and The Moldavians' Party (PM).

4 PNȚCD competed on PNL lists.

5 Right Romania Alliance (ARD) members: PDL (22 senators and 52 deputies), FC (1 senators and 3 deputies), and PNȚCD.

Presidential elections 

Notes:

1 Emil Constantinescu was the common centre-right candidate who was endorsed by the PNȚCD in both 1992 and 1996 as part of the larger Romanian Democratic Convention (CDR).

2 Mugur Isărescu was endorsed by the PNȚCD at the 2000 elections as part of the Romanian Democratic Convention 2000 (CDR 2000) alliance.

3 Electoral protocol endorsing Traian Băsescu, the candidate of the Democratic Liberal Party (PDL), due to a decision enforced by the then official fraction of the PNȚCD led by Marian Petre Miluț.

4 Elena Udrea was endorsed by the People's Movement Party (PMP)-PNȚCD alliance at the 2014 Romanian presidential election.

5 Electoral protocol endorsing Viorica Dăncilă, the candidate of the Social Democratic Party (PSD).

European elections 

Notes:

1 Electoral protocol endorsing the Social Democratic Party (PSD).

Presidents of the party

Notable members

References

Further reading 

 Lavinia Stan, “From Riches to Rags: The Romanian National Christian Democrat Peasant Party,” East European Quarterly, vol. 39, no. 2 (Summer 2005), pp. 179–227.

External links 

 Official site
 Official site of Cluj County Organization
 News about PNȚCD
 History of PNȚCD
 Past leaders of PNȚCD

1989 establishments in Romania
Agrarian parties in Romania
Centre-right parties in Europe
Christian democratic parties in Europe
Conservative parties in Romania
European Christian Political Movement
Monarchist parties in Romania
Political parties established in 1989
Registered political parties in Romania